Parancyla is a monotypic moth genus of the family Crambidae described by George Hampson in 1919. Its single species, Parancyla argyrothysana, described in the same article, is found in Malawi's Mount Mulanje.

References

Endemic fauna of Malawi
Crambinae
Monotypic moth genera
Moths of Africa
Crambidae genera
Taxa named by George Hampson